Glassonby is a small village and civil parish in the Eden Valley of Cumbria, England, about  south south east of Kirkoswald. At the 2001 census the parish had a population of 314, decreasing marginally to 308 at the 2011 Census.

There is a microlight flying centre in the village.

The Anglican church of St Michael, just to the south of the village, is not the parish church of Glassonby but of  Addingham  . The village of Addingham lay near the River Eden but was lost centuries ago when the river changed its course. The church was rebuilt using some stones from the original and the name kept for the parish. Addingham parish was divided into a number of civil parishes in 1866.

Just to the north of the village, at White House Farm, is a well-preserved late 16th-century bastle house.

The ashes of Rev. George Bramwell Evens, who was a popular broadcaster of the 1930s, were scattered at Old Parks Farm. He was a regular visitor to Glassonby in the 1920s and 1930s. He is commemorated by a memorial at Old Parks which reads 'Sacred to the memory of Rev. G. Bramwell Evens, "Romany of the BBC", whose ashes are scattered here. Born 1884. Died November 1943. He loved birds and trees and flowers and the wind on the heath'.

Private Robert Beatham VC, an Australian soldier and posthumous Victoria Cross recipient, was born in Glassonby. He emigrated to Australia as a teenager, prior to the outbreak of the First World War and was killed in action on 9 August 1918, aged 24.

Etymology
'Glassonby' means 'Glassan's bȳ'
'Bȳ' is late Old English, from Old Norse 'býr', meaning 'hamlet' or 'village'. 'Glassan' is an Irish personal name.

History

Glassonby stone circle
The Glassonby stone circle (actually a kerbed cairn) is at OS reference NY57293934 on private land. An oval cairn is surrounded by a ring of kerb stones (30 stones in all, although some have been taken away and others added from field clearance over the years). Two of the stones had markings in the form of concentric rings or spirals and semi-ovoids. The stones were not set in sockets, but were supported by the cairn material. A cist was found inside the circle, which had been robbed, as well a transparent blue glass, probably a later votive offering. Outside the circle, burnt bones and an inverted collared urn were found. The bones were the remains of a man; a second cremation, without an urn, was possibly that of a woman. There are ditch marks that suggest there was a ring ditch, the terminus of a cursus. This, and the markings suggest a link to the Long Meg complex to the south-west, and to the Old Parks circle to the north-east.

Old Parks cairn
This cairn, no longer extant, was at OS NY56993988, just north of the Glassonby circle. To the west of the stones were 32 deposits of burnt bones, with accompanying Beaker ware cups, fragments of urns and 12 shale beads. Other pits were found to the east. Two of the decorated stones, along with incense cups and flint instruments found at the site, are on display at the Tullie House Museum in Carlisle.

Glassonby Civil Parish 

The civil parish of Glassonby stretches from the banks of the River Eden to the summits of the North Pennines, where it borders Alston Moor. In addition to Glassonby itself it includes the village of Gamblesby, a separate civil parish until 1934, and the hamlets of Glassonbybeck, Maughanby and Unthank.

See also

Listed buildings in Glassonby

References

External links
  Cumbria County History Trust: Glassonby (nb: provisional research only - see Talk page)

 
Villages in Cumbria
Civil parishes in Cumbria
Eden District
Archaeological sites in Cumbria